Enia Ninčević (born 9 July 1990) is a Croatian sports sailor.

She was born in Split, Croatia. At the 2012 Summer Olympics, she competed in the women's 470 class where, alongside crewmate Romana Župan, she finished 17th.

References

1990 births
Living people
Croatian female sailors (sport)
Olympic sailors of Croatia
Sailors at the 2012 Summer Olympics – 470
Mediterranean Games silver medalists for Croatia
Competitors at the 2013 Mediterranean Games
Mediterranean Games medalists in sailing
Sportspeople from Split, Croatia